Ron Auchettl (4 August 1946 – 2 December 2012) was an Australian rules footballer who played with Carlton in the Victorian Football League (VFL).

Notes

External links 

Ron Auchettl's profile at Blueseum
RIP Ron Achettl

1946 births
2012 deaths
Carlton Football Club players
Australian rules footballers from Victoria (Australia)